is a Japanese rugby union player who plays as a Hooker. He currently plays for Suntory Sungoliath in Japan's domestic Top League.

International
Nakamura received his first call-up to his country, Japan head coach Jamie Joseph has named Shunta Nakamura in a 52-man training squad ahead of British and Irish Lions test.

References

External links
itsrugby.co.uk Profile

1994 births
Living people
Japanese rugby union players
Rugby union hookers
Tokyo Sungoliath players
21st-century Japanese people